Mario Fabbrocino (January 5, 1943 – April 23, 2019) was a powerful Italian crime boss of the Camorra – the Neapolitan mafia.

History
Mario Fabbrocino was the leader of the Fabbrocino clan, based in the Vesuvius area, with its sphere of influence around Nola, Ottaviano, San Giuseppe Vesuviano, San Gennaro Vesuviano. He was nicknamed  'o gravunaro ("the charcoal burner") and boss dei due mondi ("boss of the two worlds"), due to his business in South America.

He was one of the leaders of the Nuova Famiglia, created in the 1980s to face the rising power of Raffaele Cutolo's Nuova Camorra Organizzata. The feud with Cutolo intensified, when Cutolo ordered the killing of Fabbrocino's brother Francesco. Fabbrocino later avenged his brothers death by ordering the murder of Cutolo's only son, Roberto, on December 19, 1990.

On the run since 1988, he was among the most wanted fugitives of Italy for a murder in 1982. He was arrested in Buenos Aires, Argentina on September 3, 1997. After a long legal battle, he was extradited to Italy in March 2001.

He was released in July 2002 because the legal term for preventive custody had expired. However, he received an arrest warrant for cocaine trafficking and was arrested again. Fabbrocino was sentenced to 6 years and 4 months in January 2003. He was released in August 2004, due to time served (the time he had spent in jail in Argentina waiting for extradition was included).

He was sentenced to life imprisonment on April 13, 2005, for the killing of Roberto Cutolo (b. 1962 ; the son of Raffaele Cutolo and historical enemy of Fabbrocino) on December 19, 1990, in Tradate. He became a fugitive once more. On August 15, 2005, he was arrested again in his home in San Giuseppe Vesuviano.

Death
On April 23, 2019, Fabbrocino died in the hospital of the Parma prison, where he was serving a life sentence.

On April 28, 2019 he was buried in the cemetery of Ottaviano, his native city, with a brief private ceremony after the public funeral had been denied by the State.

References

1943 births
2019 deaths
Camorristi sentenced to life imprisonment
Fugitives
Fugitives wanted by Italy
Italian crime bosses
Italian people convicted of murder
People convicted of murder by Italy
People extradited from Argentina
People extradited to Italy
People from Ottaviano
Prisoners sentenced to life imprisonment by Italy
Prisoners who died in Italian detention